The 1982 Tour du Haut Var was the 14th edition of the Tour du Haut Var cycle race and was held on 28 February 1982. The race started in Nice and finished in Seillans. The race was won by Sean Kelly.

General classification

References

1982
February 1982 sports events in Europe
1982 in road cycling
1982 in French sport